Michael Hsu Rosen is an American actor and dancer best known for his roles as Jayden and Nabil in the Netflix series Pretty Smart and Tiny Pretty Things, respectively. Rosen also starred in the Broadway revivals of Torch Song and West Side Story.

Early life and education 
Rosen was born and raised in New York City on the Upper West Side. He attended Ethical Culture Fieldston School, as well as the Professional Children's School. He trained for nine years at the School of American Ballet and matriculated at Yale University before withdrawing to pursue acting full-time.

Career 
While in high school, Rosen performed with the New York City Ballet and made his Broadway debut at seventeen in the 2009 revival of West Side Story. He later returned to Broadway in revivals of On the Town and Harvey Fierstein's Torch Song.

Rosen has guest starred in such television shows as Jessica Jones, Monsterland, and The Good Doctor as well as earned main roles in Netflix's Tiny Pretty Things and Pretty Smart.

Filmography

Film

Television

Stage

Broadway

Off-Broadway

References

External links 
 

American male film actors
American male television actors
American male ballet dancers
Male actors from New York City
American gay actors
1991 births
Living people
Dancers from New York (state)
21st-century American dancers
21st-century American male actors
Yale University alumni
School of American Ballet alumni
Ethical Culture Fieldston School alumni